Dennis Andres (born 23 June 1987) is a German-Canadian actor and stuntman. He is best known for playing one of the lead roles of Ian Matthews on the CBC and Netflix hit show Workin' Moms.

Early life
 
Andres was raised in Berlin, Germany; his family later immigrated to Canada, settling in Hamilton, Ontario. As a child, he earned a black belt in Wado Kai Karate and Kickboxing and went on to place 6th in all of Canada for The WKF (World Karate Federation) Nationals at the age of 18. He attended Cathedral High School where he was a captain of his football team, but withdrew after suffering a number of injuries. A co-op counsellor recommended he become a stuntman; she introduced him to the school drama teacher who became his mentor, setting him up with an apprenticeship at the Players Guild of Hamilton community theatre.

Career

After working a few theatre productions backstage, Andres took on a role as an actor in a theatre production at the Players Guild, performing the role of Jacob in the play Salt Water Moon. Soon after, he sought out his first agent through a close friend, and began booking roles in TV and film. He was cast in his first leading film role in Lady Psycho Killer in 2015.

In 2016, Andres was cast as Ian Matthews, one of the fathers in Workin' Moms, a half-hour episodic written by the show's creator and lead actress, Catherine Reitman. He later reprised his role in seasons 2, 3, and 4.

In 2018, he booked a supporting role as Justin Hayes opposite Hannah Simone in the pilot episode of The Greatest American Hero. He has since appeared in a variety of television roles on shows including The Strain, The Good Witch, Star Trek: Discovery and Diggstown. 

In June 2020, Andres starred alongside Sofia Carson and Enrico Colantoni in the Elissa Down-directed Netflix Original Feel the Beat''. He played the lead role in TV movies' Blueprint to the Heart as Brooks (2020), and Hint of Love, as Will Fryer (2020). 

His latest project is the upcoming Colors of Love, where he plays the supportive big brother, Craig Harris, to Taylor, played by Jessica Lowndes. Also starring Chad Michael Murray, the film will be released in 2021.

References

External links
Dennis Andres on IMDB

1987 births
Living people
21st-century Canadian male actors
Male actors from Berlin
Male actors from Hamilton, Ontario
The Greatest American Hero